{{DISPLAYTITLE:C9H9NO2}}
The molecular formula C9H9NO2 (molar mass: 163.17 g/mol, exact mass: 163.0633 u) may refer to:

 2,6-Diacetylpyridine
 Phenyl-2-nitropropene (P2NP)

Molecular formulas